The Ribeira Sacra "Patrimonio de la Humanidad" International Ladies Open was a women's professional golf tournament on the LET Access Series, held between 2013 and 2019 near Lugo in the autonomous community of Galicia, Spain.

The tournament, always played at the Augas Santas Balneario & Golf Resort, was first introduced as the Ocho Golf Ladies Open – Galicia in 2013. In 2014 it was renamed the OCA Augas Santas International Ladies Open, the fourth event of the LETAS season and the only event in Spain on the schedule that year. The following season the tournament was renamed after Ribeira Sacra, a Spanish World Heritage Site nomination.

Winners

References

External links

LET Access Series events
Golf tournaments in Spain